Ranyah is a governorate in Najd in Saudi Arabia, located in the valley of the same name. Ranyah's population in 2010 was 45,942.

References

Governorates of Saudi Arabia